Engineering fits are generally used as part of geometric dimensioning and tolerancing when a part or assembly is designed. In engineering terms, the "fit" is the clearance between two mating parts, and the size of this clearance determines whether the parts can, at one end of the spectrum, move or rotate independently from each other or, at the other end, are temporarily or permanently joined. Engineering fits are generally described as a "shaft and hole" pairing, but are not necessarily limited to just round components. ISO is the internationally accepted standard for defining engineering fits, but ANSI is often still used in North America.

ISO and ANSI both group fits into three categories: clearance, location or transition, and interference. Within each category are several codes to define the size limits of the hole or shaft - the combination of which determines the type of fit. A fit is usually selected at the design stage according to whether the mating parts need to be accurately located, free to slide or rotate, separated easily, or resist separation. Cost is also a major factor in selecting a fit, as more accurate fits will be more expensive to produce, and tighter fits will be more expensive to assemble.

Methods of producing work to the required tolerances to achieve a desired fit range from casting, forging and drilling for the widest tolerances through broaching, reaming, milling and turning to lapping and honing at the tightest tolerances.

ISO system of limits and fits

Overview 
The International Organization for Standardization system splits the three main categories into several individual fits based on the allowable limits for hole and shaft size. Each fit is allocated a code, made up of a number and a letter, which is used on engineering drawings in place of upper & lower size limits to reduce clutter in detailed areas.

Hole and shaft basis 
A fit is either specified as shaft-basis or hole-basis, depending on which part has its size controlled to determine the fit. In a hole-basis system, the size of the hole remains constant and the diameter of the shaft is varied to determine the fit; conversely, in a shaft-basis system the size of shaft remains constant and the hole diameter is varied to determine the fit.

The ISO system uses an alpha-numeric code to illustrate the tolerance ranges for the fit, with the upper-case representing the hole tolerance and lower-case representing the shaft. For example, in H7/h6 (a commonly-used fit) H7 represents the tolerance range of the hole and h6 represents the tolerance range of the shaft. These codes can be used by machinists or engineers to quickly identify the upper and lower size limits for either the hole or shaft. The potential range of clearance or interference can be found by subtracting the smallest shaft diameter from the largest hole, and largest shaft from the smallest hole.

Types of fit 
The three types of fit are:
 Clearance: The hole is larger than the shaft, enabling the two parts to slide and / or rotate when assembled, e.g., piston & valves
 Location / transition: The hole is fractionally smaller than the shaft and mild force is required to assemble / disassemble e.g., Shaft key
 Interference: The hole is smaller than the shaft and high force and / or heat is required to assemble / disassemble e.g., Bearing bush

Clearance fits 

For example, using an H8/f7 close-running fit on a 50mm diameter:
 H8 (hole) tolerance range = +0.000mm to +0.039
 f7 (shaft) tolerance range = −0.050mm to −0.025mm
 Potential clearance will be between +0.025mm and +0.089mm

Transition fits 

For example, using an H7/k6 similar fit on a 50mm diameter:
 H7 (hole) tolerance range = +0.000mm to +0.025mm
 k6 (shaft) tolerance range = +0.002mm to +0.018mm
 Potential clearance / interference will be between +0.023mm and −0.018mm

Interference fits 

For example, using an H7/p6 press fit on a 50mm diameter:
 H7 (hole) tolerance range = +0.000mm to +0.025mm
 p6 (shaft) tolerance range = +0.042mm to +0.026mm
 Potential interference will be between −0.001mm and −0.042mm.

Useful tolerances 
Common tolerances for sizes ranging from 0 to 120 mm

ANSI fit classes (USA only)

Interference fits 

Interference fits, also known as press fits or friction fits, are fastenings between two parts in which the inner component is larger than the outer component. Achieving an interference fit requires applying force during assembly. After the parts are joined, the mating surfaces will feel pressure due to friction, and deformation of the completed assembly will be observed.

Force fits 

Force fits are designed to maintain a controlled pressure between mating parts, and are used where forces or torques are being transmitted through the joining point. Like interference fits, force fits are achieved by applying a force during component assembly.

FN 1 to FN 5

Shrink fits 

Shrink fits serve the same purpose as force fits, but are achieved by heating one member to expand it while the other remains cool. The parts can then be easily put together with little  applied force, but after cooling and contraction, the same dimensional interference exists as for a force fit. Like force fits, shrink fits range from FN 1 to FN 5.

Location fits 

Location fits are for parts that do not normally move relative to each other.

Location interference fit  

LN 1 to LN 3  ( or LT 7 to LT 21?  )

Location transition fit 

LT 1 to LT 6
Location fit is for have comparatively better fit than slide fit.

Location clearance fit

LC 1 to LC 11

RC fits 

The smaller RC numbers have smaller clearances for tighter fits, the larger numbers have larger clearances for looser fits.

RC1: close sliding fits 

Fits of this kind are intended for the accurate location of parts which must assemble without noticeable play.

RC2: sliding fits 

Fits of this kind are intended for the accurate location but with greater maximum clearance than class RC1. Parts made to this fit turn and move easily. This type is not designed for free run. Sliding fits in larger sizes may seize with small temperature changes due to little allowance for thermal expansion or contraction.

RC3: precision running fits 

Fits of this kind are about the closest fits which can be expected to run freely. Precision fits are intended for precision work at low speed, low bearing pressures, and light journal pressures. RC3 is not suitable where noticeable temperature differences occur.

RC4: close running fits 

Fits of this kind are mostly for running fits on accurate machinery with moderate surface speed, bearing pressures, and journal pressures where accurate location and minimum play are desired. Fits of this kind also can be described as smaller clearances with higher requirements for precision fit.

RC5 and R6: medium running fits 

Fits of this kind are designed for machines running at higher running speeds, considerable bearing pressures, and heavy journal pressure. Fits of this kind also can be described with greater clearances with common requirements for fit precision.

RC7: Free running fits 

Fits of this kind are intended for use where accuracy is not essential. It is suitable for great temperature variations. This fit is suitable to use without any special requirements for precise guiding of shafts into certain holes.

RC8 and RC9: loose running fits 

Fits of this kind are intended for use where wide commercial tolerances may be required on the shaft. With these fits, the parts with great clearances with having great tolerances. Loose running fits may be exposed to effects of corrosion, contamination by dust, and thermal or mechanical deformations.

See also
Geometric dimensioning and tolerancing
Engineering tolerance
Interchangeable parts
Statistical interference
Coiled spring pins

References

Mechanical engineering
Metalworking terminology